The Rondo in C minor (WAB 208) is a composition for string quartet by the Austrian composer Anton Bruckner. It was written in 1862 but was not performed publicly until 1984, after the composer's death. A critical edition was first published in 1985 and the piece was first recorded in 1992 by the Raphael Quartet.

History
During his stay in Linz, Bruckner composed his String Quartet in 1862 as a student exercise assigned by his form and orchestration teacher, Otto Kitzler. On reviewing Bruckner's work, Kitzler was perhaps dissatisfied with Bruckner's unconventionality of the first rondo. He therefore suggested that a new rondo in a more traditional rondo-sonata form would have benefited the piece. Bruckner responded by creating this new large rondo form, creating a new work significantly different in musical content from the original as well as noticeably longer, with a performance time of approximately five minutes. This second Rondo, which has the same key, metre, and formal structure as the first Rondo, can be regarded as an alternative to the first Rondo.

The autograph date on the work is 15 August 1862. As with the other works Bruckner composed during Kitzler's tuition, the Quartet and the additional Rondo were not performed or issued during Bruckner's life. Bruckner did not intend for the Quartet to be publicly performed with either rondo, or for the Rondo in C minor to be performed independently, as he saw these compositions only as technical studies for the purposes of practicing form. Since the work was not known at the time of Renate Grasberger's thematic catalogue of Bruckner's music,  (WAB), it was initially referred to as "WAB deest" and later as WAB 208 by the Österreichische Akademie der Wissenschaften.

Leopold Nowak, the musicologist known for editing the works of Bruckner, was permitted to access the Kitzler-Studienbuch, which was in private possession, and to transcribe the Rondo in C minor. The Rondo was premiered on 17 August 1984 in Vienna as part of a celebration of his eightieth birthday. Nowak's edited critical edition of the Rondo was first published in 1985 in Band XII of Bruckner's .

Music 
The 233-bar piece in C minor and  time is marked as Allegro molto moderato. It is sparingly notated, with few indications of dynamic. The rondo is in seven parts:

Writing for AllMusic, Wayne Reisig remarks that the work's "overall fleet mood will bring to mind Mendelssohn. The reviewer Richard Whitehouse notes that the Rondo's "less angular phrasing and the secondary theme's more expansive manner give the composer greater room to elaborate his material" than in the String Quartet's original rondo. He also describes "a more fully developed central section, serving to place less emphasis on the themes at their reappearance" and a coda that "draws on more imitative means to less forceful ends". The critic Robert Markow for the music publication Fanfare suggests that the Rondo "sounds far more like Haydn than like the Bruckner we know from the symphonies that were soon to follow".

Discography
There are only a few performances of Bruckner's Rondo in C minor: 
 Raphael Quartet. Bruckner: String Quintet. Rondo. Intermezzo. Globe 5078, 1992
 L'Archibudelli. Anton Bruckner: String Quintet. Intermezzo. Rondo. String Quartet. Sony Classical Vivarte SK 66 251, 1995
 Fine Arts Quartet, 2003. Download from Classics online; SWR 10241
 Ruysdael Quartet. First Steps. Cobra Records 0032, 2006
 Fine Arts Quartet. BRUCKNER: String Quintet in F Major / String Quartet in C Minor. Naxos 8.570788, 2008

References

Further reading 
 Anton Bruckner: Sämtliche Werke: Band XII/1: Rondo c-Moll, Musikwissenschaftlicher Verlag der Internationalen Bruckner-Gesellschaft, Leopold Nowak (Ed.), Vienna, 1985.
 Anton Bruckner – Sämtliche Werke, Band XXV: Das Kitzler Studienbuch (1861–1863), facsimile, Musikwissenschaftlicher Verlag der Internationalen Bruckner-Gesellschaft, Paul Hawkshaw and Erich Wolfgang Partsch (Editors), Vienna, 2015
 William Carragan. Anton Bruckner - Eleven Symphonies. Bruckner Society of America, Windsor CT, 2020. ISBN 978-1-938911-59-0.

External links 

 Rondo c-Moll, WAB 208 – Critical discography by Hans Roelofs 
 The performance by the Ruysdael Quartet can also be heard on YouTube: Ruysdael Quartet - Anton Bruckner, Rondo c-minor for string quartet

Chamber music by Anton Bruckner
1862 compositions
Compositions for string quartet
Compositions in C minor